Cis creberrimus is a species of minute tree-fungus beetle in the family Ciidae. It is found in the Caribbean Sea, Central America, North America, and South America.

References

Further reading

 
 

Ciidae
Articles created by Qbugbot
Beetles described in 1848